Jordan Ramos (born 18 July 1995 in Rio de Janeiro, Brazil) is a British sprinter, former British Gymnast, five-times British Tumbling (gymnastics) Champion, a European Silver Medallist, a Guinness World Records Breaker for the longest slam dunk from a trampoline. Jordan Ramos also entered into the 2011 edition of the Guinness World Records book, for the farthest basketball slam dunk from a trampoline.

Biography

Family
Jordan is the son of Brazilian Stuntman "Marcelo The Daredevil" and Acrobat and Keep Fit Instructor Anita Grosvenor Ramos.  He's the eldest son of the Ramos Family, having 2 younger brothers, gymnast Samuel Ramos and Rio Ramos. Jordan also participates in the family act The Ramos Acrobats alongside mum Anita, dad Marcelo and brother Samuel.

Sports

Gymnastics
Jordan began training gymnastics and acrobatics with his dad at the age of 2, and by the time he had reached his 10th birthday he became a British Tumbling (gymnastics) Champion. Jordan has represented Great Britain in 2 World Junior Championships and 1 European Championship. Ranking top six in two of the World Tumbling (gymnastics) Championships and winning a gold medal at the Loule World Cup in Portugal in 2007.  He also went on to win a Silver European medal in France in 2010.

Reality TV

Guinness World Record Smashed
Because of his amazing gymnastics ability, in 2008 he was set a challenge by Sky1 to try and beat the Record for the longest slam dunk ever performed from a trampoline. He rose to the challenge and live on TV at Pinewood Studio, Jordan at just 13 became the Guinness World Record Breaker. He held onto his Record for 3 Years performing on programs such as Blue Peter, China Central Television and also on Italian TV.  In 2011 he entered the Guinness Book of Records.

Wife Swap Controversy
On 29 June 2009 Jordan, his mum, dad and brother Samuel appeared on the last series of the British Reality TV program Wife Swap on Channel 4. In the program the swapping mum was not happy because at the time, 13-year-old Jordan and five-year-old Samuel spend over nine hours each week training trampolining and tumbling (gymnastics).  On the rule change, she made the boys stay at home to bake cakes instead of training gymnastics.

References

External links
 Jordan Ramos official website
 Acrobats – Jordan is part of The Ramos Acrobats

Living people
Sportspeople from Liverpool
British male trampolinists
1995 births
Male gymnasts
People from Rio de Janeiro (city)
Brazilian emigrants to the United Kingdom